A baymouth bar is a depositional feature as a result of longshore drift. It is a sandbank that partially or completely closes access to a bay.

Background
These bars usually consist of accumulated gravel and sand carried by the current of longshore drift and deposited at a less turbulent part of the current. Thus, they most commonly occur across artificial bay and river entrances due to the loss of kinetic energy in the current after wave refraction.

References

Spits (landform)
Coastal and oceanic landforms
Coastal geography